Jahnstadion is a multi-use stadium in Rheda-Wiedenbrück, Germany.  It is currently used mostly for football matches and is the home stadium of SC Wiedenbrück 2000. The stadium currently has a capacity of 3,500 spectators and opened in 2000.

References

External links
Venue information

Football venues in Germany
Sports venues in North Rhine-Westphalia
Buildings and structures in Gütersloh (district)